C. californica  may refer to:
 Calliandra californica, the Baja fairy duster, a shrub species native to Mexico
 Callipepla californica, the California quail, California valley quail or valley quail,  a small ground-dwelling bird species
 Camissonia californica, the California suncup, a flowering plant species native to California and Arizona
 Campanula californica, the swamp bellflower or swamp harebell, a plant species endemic to California
 Cardamine californica, the milkmaid, a flowering plant species native to western North America from Washington to Baja California
 Carpenteria californica, an evergreen shrub species native to California
 Catocala californica, a moth species found from British Columbia and Alberta south through Washington and Oregon to California
 Colubrina californica, the Las Animas nakedwood, a shrub species native to the Sonoran Desert of the southwestern United States and northern Mexico
 Coreopsis californica, an annual plant species
 Corynactis californica, a bright red colonial anthozoan species
 Cuscuta californica, the chaparral dodder or California dodder, a plant species native to western North America
 Cylindropuntia californica, the California cholla, snake cholla or cane cholla, a cactus species native to southern California and Baja California

See also
 List of Latin and Greek words commonly used in systematic names#C